This is a list of the cast members from The Twilight Saga film series, which is based on the novels by Stephenie Meyer. The main stars of the films are Kristen Stewart as Bella Swan, Robert Pattinson as Edward Cullen, and Taylor Lautner as Jacob Black. Twilight (2008) is based on the New York Times best selling novel of the same name (2005) and was directed by Catherine Hardwicke. The second film, The Twilight Saga: New Moon (2009) is based on the first book's sequel (2006). It was directed by Chris Weitz. The third film, The Twilight Saga: Eclipse, directed by David Slade, was released on June 30, 2010. and is based on the third installment in the series (2007). The filming of Breaking Dawn Part 1 started on November 1, 2010. The Twilight Saga: Breaking Dawn – Part 1 (commonly referred to as Breaking Dawn – Part 1) released in theatres on November 18, 2011, and released to DVD on February 11, 2012 in the United States. The film grossed over $712 million worldwide.  The Twilight Saga: Breaking Dawn – Part 2 (commonly referred to as Breaking Dawn – Part 2) was released on November 16, 2012, by Lionsgate in the United States, in consequence of the merger between Lionsgate and Summit Entertainment. Both Breaking Dawn films were directed by Bill Condon. The film (101 days in release) was a box-office success, grossing over $829 million worldwide, becoming the 34th highest-grossing film, the 6th highest-grossing film of 2012 and the highest-grossing film of the Twilight series.

Cast

Notes

References

External links

 Twilight cast at the Internet Movie Database
 New Moon cast at the Internet Movie Database
 Eclipse cast at the Internet Movie Database

 
Lists of actors by film series